Scott Cao (pronounced Chow) is a violin maker (luthier), who is originally from China but now works in Campbell, California, United States.

Biography
In the mid-1970s, amidst Mao's cultural revolution, Cao was a farm worker. A violin-making teacher who visited the area offered him the opportunity of an apprenticeship. He graduated from the Guangzhou Institute of Professions in 1977.

When China opened its borders Cao went to the United States in 1985. He originally stayed in San Francisco where a violin dealer suggested that he should study repairing older instruments under a master luthier.   His mentors included eminent violin makers such as Louiz Bellini, Hans Weisshaar, and Roland Feller.  In 1990, Scott partnered with Hideo Kamimoto to start a violin shop and returned to China, where he founded a company which makes affordable instruments and bows, including violas, cellos, basses, guitars and established Scott Cao Violins. Three years later Scott was able to open his own shop in the United States in Campbell, California.

His best instruments are meticulous copies of famous Stradivari and Guarneri designs.

Awards
Silver medal for viola, 1996 VSA international competition.
Silver medal for violin, 1996 VSA international competition.
Third place overall, viola, 1994, 7th international Antonio Stradivari competition, Cremona, Italy.
Certificate of Merit for violin tone, 1992 VSA competition.
Two first place for violin tone and workmanship, 1990 Violin Maker's Association of British Columbia.
Tone and Workmanship award for viola, 1988 VSA competition.
Tone award for violin, 1986 VSA competition.

Owners and players
His instruments are known to have been owned or played by:

 Nigel Kennedy
 Gidon Kremer
 Itzhak Perlman
 Mischa Maisky
 Elmar Oliveira
 Eduard Schmieder
 Bin Huang
 Li Chuan Yun
 Ning Feng
 Siqing Lu
 Sergio Prieto

References

External links 
 Official website: http://www.scottcaoviolins.com
 Instrument of History article about Scott Cao http://www.metroactive.com/papers/metro/11.18.99/violin-9946.html

Chinese luthiers
Living people
Year of birth missing (living people)